Dover Township is one of nineteen current townships in Pope County, Arkansas, USA. As of the 2010 census, its unincorporated population was 5,704.

Geography
Land makes up , and water makes up the remaining .

Cities, towns, villages
 Dover
 Russellville (part)

References
 United States Census Bureau 2008 TIGER/Line Shapefiles
 United States Board on Geographic Names (GNIS)
 United States National Atlas

External links
 US-Counties.com
 City-Data.com

Populated places established in 1854
Townships in Pope County, Arkansas
Townships in Arkansas
1854 establishments in Arkansas